The Dan River ( Dan,  Leddan) is a tributary of the Jordan River.  The sources of the river are multiple springs emerging from Tel Dan along underground fault lines.

The river is so named after the Israelite city of Dan, which was captured by the Tribe of Dan during the Judges period.  The tribe of Dan conquered the city, then named Laish and then occupied by Canaanites.

Although the Dan River itself is only about 20 km (12 miles) long, its flow provides up to 238 million cubic meters of water annually to the Hulah Valley. In 1966, this was a cause of dispute between Israeli water planners and conservationists, with the latter prevailing after three years of court appeals and adjudication.

References

External links

 Tel Dan , The Department for Jewish Zionist Education

Tributaries of the Jordan River
Hebrew Bible rivers
Rivers of Israel